The Democratic Liberal Party (Minshujiyūtō) was a political party in Japan.

History
The party was established in March 1948 as a merger of the Liberal Party, Dōshi Club and a faction of the Democratic Party led by Saitō Takao. United by their opposition to the coal nationalisation law, the new party had 152 MPs and 46 members of the House of Councillors.

As a result of the DLP's attempts to block Yamazaki Takeshi from forming a new government after Hitoshi Ashida resigned as Prime Minister, the party's Shigeru Yoshida became Prime Minister in October 1948 and early elections were called in January 1949. The DLP won a landslide victory, taking 269 of the 466 seats, the first time a party had held a majority of seats since World War II. Shigeru Yoshida continued as Prime Minister.

In March 1950 the party merged with the Alliance faction of the Democratic Party to form the new Liberal Party.

Leader

Election results

House of Representatives

References

Defunct political parties in Japan
Political parties established in 1948
1948 establishments in Japan
Political parties disestablished in 1950
1950 disestablishments in Japan